Anywhere is a 1970 album by Japanese rock band Flower Travellin' Band. It was their first release under the Flower Travellin' Band name and the first to feature the classic line-up of Joe Yamanaka, Hideki Ishima, Jun Kozuki and Joji Wada. AllMusic rated the album 3 out of 5 stars, describing the music as a "unique mixture of progressive daring, psychedelic eccentricity, and muscular, heavy rock austerity".

Overview
Following the release of Challenge!, Yuya Uchida dropped all the members of Yuya Uchida & The Flowers, except drummer Joji Wada, recruited guitarist Hideki Ishima, vocalist Joe Yamanaka and bassist Jun Kozuki, and formed the Flower Travellin' Band as a band that would appeal to international audiences.

Anywhere was made to emulate the band's previous release Challenge! by mainly consisting of cover songs and nude cover art, before releasing their first original album, Satori, shortly after. The cover was taken early in the morning at a former garbage dump in the seaside area that would later become Odaiba. It was used as the cover for Julian Cope's 2007 book Japrocksampler.

Track listing

Credits 
 Joe Yamanaka – vocals, harmonica
 Hideki Ishima – guitar
 Jun Kozuki – bass
 Joji Wada – drums
 Tadataka Watanabe - producer
 Yuya Uchida - producer
 Norio Yoshizawa - engineer
 Tatsuo Umetsu - engineer
 Masaichiro Fukami - artwork
 Kishin Shinoyama - photography
 Makoto Saito - photography

References 

Flower Travellin' Band albums
1970 debut albums
Covers albums
Philips Records albums